Sepia burnupi is a species of cuttlefish native to the southwestern Indian Ocean, specifically southeast Africa, from Port Elizabeth to southern Mozambique and the Saya-de-Malha Bank. It lives at a depth of between 40 and 240 m.

Sepia burnupi grows to a mantle length of 90 mm.

The type specimen was collected near Umkomaas, KwaZulu-Natal, South Africa. It is deposited at The Natural History Museum in London.

References

External links

Cuttlefish
Molluscs described in 1904
Taxa named by William Evans Hoyle